Twin Oaks may refer to:

Localities
 Twin Oaks, Kern County, California, an unincorporated community
 Twin Oaks, San Diego County, California, see San Marcos, California
 Twin Oaks, Missouri, a village in St. Louis County
 Twin Oaks, Oklahoma, an unincorporated community and census-designated place in Delaware County
 Twin Oaks Community, Virginia, in Louisa County, Virginia

Other places
 Twin Oaks (Linthicum Heights, Maryland), listed on the NRHP in Anne Arundel County, Maryland
 Twin Oaks (Wyoming, Ohio), listed on the NRHP in Ohio
 Twin Oaks (Washington, D.C.), listed on the NRHP in Washington, D.C.
 Twin Oaks Plantation, a house on the National Register of Historic Places near Eutaw, Alabama
 Stark's Twin Oaks Airpark, A privately owned, public use airport in Hillsboro Oregon